() is a multi-course meal in Kashmiri cuisine, originating from Kashmir.

Almost all the dishes are meat-based using lamb or chicken with few vegetarian dishes. It is popular throughout the larger Kashmir region. Moreover, Wazwan is also served internationally at Kashmiri food festivals and reunions.

History
 
In the Kashmiri language,  means 'cook' or 'cooking' and  means 'shop'. The ultimate formal banquet in Kashmir is the royal . Yogurt and chutney are served separately in small earthen pots. The  is a large meatball which signals the end of the main course. After that, desserts are served. In winters, the dessert can be a hot sweet dish and in summers, it is usually something cold.

List of main dishes

 Rista (meatballs in a fiery red gravy) 
 Lahabi kabab or Moachi kabab (flattened mutton kababs cooked in yogurt)
 Waza kokur (two halves or two full chicken cooked whole)
 Daeni phoul (mutton dish)
 Doudha ras (mutton cooked in sweet milk gravy)
 Rogan josh (tender lamb cooked with Kashmiri spices)
 Tseer-e-Gushtab (A soft meatball with apricot inside cooked with yogurt)
 Tabak maaz (ribs of lamb simmered in yogurt till tender, then fried) 
 Daniwal korma (a mutton curry with coriander)
 Waza palak (green spinach cooked with small mutton balls known as )
 Aab gosh (lamb cooked in milk curry)
 Marchwangan korma (an extremely spicy lamb dish)
 Kabab (minced meat roasted on skewers over hot coals) 
 Gushtaba (a velvety textured meatball in white yogurt gravy)
 Yakh'n (delicately spiced yogurt curry)
 Ruwangan chhaman (cheese (paneer) squares with tomato gravy)
 Dum aelva (potatoes cooked in yogurt gravy)
 Dum aloo
 Gand aanchaar (chopped onions mixed with chilies, salt, yogurt and spices)
 Muji chetin or mooli akhrot chutney (radish and walnut chutney)
 Phirni (a milk pudding thickened with semolina or ground rice, flavored with cardamom and optionally saffron, set in individual bowls with slivered nuts and silver leaf)

See also

 Kanger
 Kashmiri cuisine
 Kashmiri literature
 Kashmiriyat
 List of chicken dishes
 List of lamb dishes
 Noon Chai

References
http://kashmironline.net/category/food/wazwan/

Further reading

Kashmiri cuisine
Indo-Caribbean cuisine
Lamb dishes
Indian chicken dishes
Pakistani chicken dishes